Meenambur is a small village in Gingee taluk, Viluppuram district in the state of Tamil Nadu, India.

References

Villages in Viluppuram district